Arceuthobium littorum is a species of dwarf mistletoe known as coastal dwarf mistletoe. It is endemic to the coastline of northern California, where it lives as a parasite on Bishop Pine and Monterey Pine trees. This is a dark brown or greenish shrub which is visible as a network of scaly stems extending above the bark of its host tree. Most of the mistletoe is located inside the host tree, attached to it via haustoria, which tap the tree for water and nutrients. The leaves of the mistletoe are reduced to scales on its surface.

References

External links
Jepson Manual Treatment

littorum
Flora of California
Plants described in 1992
Taxa named by Daniel Lee Nickrent
Flora without expected TNC conservation status